is a Japanese popular music singer.

Biography 
Inagaki was born and raised in Sendai, the capital of Miyagi Prefecture, and graduated from Miyagi Prefectural Technical High School.  One of his earliest musical influences was Stevie Wonder.  While a student in middle school, he joined a local band called Faces as a vocalist and drummer.  Later, he also performed in bands that entertained United States military personnel stationed in Yokosuka and Tachikawa.  Beginning with his commercial debut single "Rainy Regret" (雨のリグレット Ame no riguretto) in 1982, Inagaki released a series of popular hits.

Inagaki's music became especially well known throughout the 1980s and 1990s.  His songs have appeared on several drama programs and numerous commercial advertisements on Japanese television.  His 1992 ballad "When The Christmas Carols Play" (クリスマスキャロルの頃には Kurisumasu kyaroru no koro ni wa) was featured on the TBS drama series Homework (ホームワーク), and remains one of the most popular holiday songs in Japan.

As of 2010, Inagaki continues to tour in Japan, and performed in Tokyo, Osaka, and Nagoya in June 2010. In a rare performance abroad, he held a private concert in San Francisco sponsored by the Japanese Chamber of Commerce of Northern California on January 11, 2009.

Inagaki's first wife of more than 30 years died in 2006.  He remarried in October 2007, and hosted a wedding reception in Tokyo for family and close friends in March 2008.

Discography

Original studio albums

Compilation and live albums

Cover and duet albums

Singles

References

External links 
 Official site 
 Universal Music Japan 
 Teichiku Entertainment  
 Twitter 

1953 births
Living people
Japanese male singers
People from Sendai
Musicians from Miyagi Prefecture